Sinarmas MSIG Tower is a skyscraper at Sudirman Avenue, Jakarta, Indonesia. The 48 story building was completed in 2015, construction having begun in 2012. Architecturally the tower is 245 meters tall. The building serves as the headquarters of Indonesian insurance company Sinarmas MSIG. 
The tower was built using modern and environmentally friendly principles and materials such as Low E Glass, a double glass system that can reduce heat and sound leakage, as the embodiment of a building with energy efficiency. 
In addition it has Building Automation System (BAS) to control water, electricity, and air conditioning.

See also
Skyscraper design and construction
List of tallest buildings in Indonesia

References

Skyscraper office buildings in Indonesia
Buildings and structures in Jakarta
Office buildings completed in 2015
Post-independence architecture of Indonesia